Mauricio Laureano Alvarenga Barraza (born 24 June 1951) is a Salvadoran retired footballer who played as a goalkeeper.

Club career
Alvarenga played the majority of his career in the Primera División de Fútbol de El Salvador, representing clubs such as Atlético Marte, Juventud Olímpica, Tapachulteca, Once Lobos, and CESSA. He spent two seasons abroad, one in Guatemala with Municipal and one in Belize with San Joaquin.

International career
Alvarenga was the first-choice goalkeeper for the El Salvador under-20 side that won the 1964 CONCACAF Youth Tournament. It marked the first time that El Salvador won a CONCACAF youth championship.

Alvarenga earned caps for the El Salvador national team in the 1970s. He represented his country in 1973 and 1977 CONCACAF Championship qualification.

Honors
Atlético Marte
 Primera División de Fútbol de El Salvador: 1968–69, 1970, 1982

Once Lobos
 Segunda División de El Salvador: 1995–96

Municipal
 Copa Fraternidad Centroamericana: 1974

El Salvador
 CONCACAF Under-20 Championship: 1964

References

1951 births
Living people
Salvadoran footballers
Association football goalkeepers
C.D. Atlético Marte footballers
C.S.D. Municipal players
Primera División de Fútbol Profesional players
Liga Nacional de Fútbol de Guatemala players
El Salvador international footballers
Atletico Marte managers
Salvadoran expatriate footballers
Expatriate footballers in Guatemala
Salvadoran expatriate sportspeople in Guatemala
Expatriate footballers in Belize
Salvadoran expatriate sportspeople in Belize
Salvadoran football managers